"The Real Thing" is a 1987 hit single by music producer Jellybean, which features the vocals of Steven Dante. It is featured on Jellybean's album Just Visiting This Planet. The song was most successful in clubs at the time, reaching #1 in the US Hot Dance Club Play Chart for one week.  "The Real Thing" also peaked at #49 and #82 on the soul chart and Hot 100, respectively.  Overseas, the single was successful in the UK Singles Chart, reaching #13.

Charts

References

1987 singles
1987 songs
Chrysalis Records singles